Hubert Wolf (born 26 November 1959 in Wört, Baden-Württemberg) is a German church historian and professor at the University of Münster.  He was awarded a Gottfried Wilhelm Leibniz Prize in 2003. In 2006 he was awarded the Gutenberg Prize of the International Gutenberg Society and the City of Mainz. 

After his Abitur in 1978, he studied Roman Catholic theology at University of Tübingen and Ludwig Maximilian University of Munich. He was ordained to the priesthood in 1985. In 1992 he became professor at the Goethe University Frankfurt, and in 1999 he moved to the University of Münster.

His books include Pope and Devil: The Vatican's Archives and the Third Reich, a study of the relationship between the Vatican and Adolf Hitler's administration in Germany. Die Nonnen von Sant'Ambrogio (The Nuns of Sant'Ambrogio, translated into French as Le Vice et la Grâce) describes a 19th-century religious scandal at Sant'Ambrogio della Massima.

References

External links
Faculty page at University of Munster

1959 births
University of Tübingen alumni
Academic staff of the University of Münster
20th-century German historians
Living people
21st-century German historians